Shaushak (Şawşax) is a rural locality (a village) in Uryush-Bittulinsky Selsoviet, Karaidelsky District, Bashkortostan, Russia. The population was 3 as of 2010. There are 2 streets.

Geography 
Shaushak is located 71 km southwest of Karaidel (the district's administrative centre) by road. Sedyash-Nagayevo is the nearest rural locality.

References 

Rural localities in Karaidelsky District